Pouteria multiflora is a plant in the family Sapotaceae of the order Ericales. Its English common name is bullytree. Its Spanish common names include jácana, ácana, acana, hacana, or jacana. It is native to North and South America.  The plant is common in the Toro Negro State Forest.

It yields very good timber that can be used for mill rollers, frames, furniture, and house building. Acana wood is light colored, fine and straight grained, hard, very heavy, strong, durable, and can be polished to shine. The pores are small and arranged in radial rows. Pith rays narrow and indistinct.

A similar definition of the Acana tree is given by Constantino Suarez in his Diccionario de voces Cubanas as; wild indigenous tree with a straight trunk that grows to 10 meters with coriaceous rigid oval leaves which produces a nutritious fruit smaller than the zapote, and whose wood is valued in Cuba for rustic houses and ship building because of the wood's durability and hardness, qualities enhanced by its sonority, weight, and beautiful reddish color.

Acana in the Arts
Poem: "Song of the Acana Tree" (Spanish: Canto del Acana) by Minerva Salado
Poem: "Acana" by Cuban writer Nicolás Guillén
Music: "Acana", by Cuban composer Tania León

References

multiflora
Trees of the Caribbean
Flora of the United States Virgin Islands
Trees of Cuba
Trees of Peru
Trees of Puerto Rico
Trees of Colombia
Trees of Jamaica
Trees of Ecuador
Trees of Bolivia
Trees of Venezuela
Trees of Panama
Trees of Brazil
Flora without expected TNC conservation status